Julien Auguste Pélage Brizeux (12 September 1803 – 3 May 1858) was a French poet. He was said to belong to a family of Irish origin, long settled in Brittany. He was educated for the law, but in 1827 he produced at the Théâtre Français a one-act verse comedy, Racine, in collaboration with Philippe Busoni.

His most important works are, first, Marie (1832, 1836, 1840), then, Les Bretons (1845, 1846). He also wrote in the Breton language, notably Telenn-Arvor and Furnez Breiz.

Life
Brizeux was born at Lorient (Morbihan. Though he was brought up with the Cornouaille dialect of Breton, in his Breton language verse he used the standardised Breton orthography codified by Jean-François Le Gonidec. He became an ardent student of the philology and archaeology of Brittany, and had collected materials for a dictionary of Breton place-names.

A journey to Italy in company with Auguste Barbier made a great impression on him, and a second visit (1834) resulted in 1841 in the publication of a complete French translation of Dante's Divine Comedy in terza rima. In his collection Primel el Nola (1852) he included poems written under Italian influence, entitled Les Ternaires (1841), but in the rustic idyll of Marie (1836) he turned to Breton country life. In Les Bretons (1845) he found his inspiration in the folklore and legends of his native province. In La Chasse du Prince Arthur he created a narrative around the short life of Arthur I, Duke of Brittany, murdered by King John of England. His Histoires poétiques (1855) was crowned by membership in the French Academy.

Following his death at Montpellier in 1858, his Œuvres complètes (2 vols., 1860) were edited with an assessment of the author by Saint-René Taillandier. Another edition appeared in 1880–1884 (4 vols.). A long list of articles on his work may be consulted in an exhaustive monograph, Brizeux. Sa vie et ses œuvres (1898), by the abbé C. Lecigne.

Known as "le prince des bardes bretons", he was credited as the founder of modern Breton literature by later Breton Celticists. Théodore Botrel created a monument to him in Pont-Aven, which is ceremonially adorned each year at the Fête des Fleurs d’Ajonc. His works in Breton, Telenn Arvor (1844), and his collection of proverbs, Furnez Breiz (1845), were republished by Roparz Hemon in the Breton language literary magazine Gwalarn in 1929.

Works
 Racine, one-act comedy in verse, with Philippe Busoni, Paris, Théâtre-Français, 27 décembre 1827
 Marie, verse novel, 1832 on line text
 Les Ternaires, book of lyrics, 1841
 Les Bretons, narrative poem, 1845
 Furnez Breiz, 1845 Text in Wikisource
 Histoires poétiques, suivies d'un Essai sur l'art, ou Poétique nouvelle, 1855 on line text
 Primel et Nola, 1852
Editions and translations
 Mémoires de Madame de La Vallière, 2 vol., 1829 
 La Divine Comédie de Dante Alighieri, traduction nouvelle par A. Brizeux,.avec une notice et des notes par le même, 1841
Posthumous publications
 Œuvres complètes, 2 vol., 1860 on line text 1 2
 Œuvres, 1874 on line text
 Œuvres, 4 vol., 1879-1884 on line texts 1 : Marie. Télen Arvor. Furnez Breiz. 2 : Les Bretons. 3 : Les Fleurs d'or (Les Ternaires). Histoires poétiques I-III 4 : Histoires poétiques IV-V. Cycle. Poétique nouvelle.
 Marie, poème. Primel et Nola, preface by Saint-René Taillandier, illustrations by Henri Pille, 1882
 Œuvres choisies, 1910
 Choix de poésies, 1932
 Telenn arvor furnez Breiz peurreizet hag embannet gant Roparz Hemo, 1932
 Un Poète romantique et ses amis : correspondance 1805-1858. Auguste Brizeux, letters, edited by Jean-Louis Debauve, Brest, Centre de recherche bretonne et celtique, 1989

See also
 Orientalism

References

External links
 
 

1803 births
1858 deaths
19th-century French poets
19th-century French male writers
Breton-language writers
Poets from Brittany
French male poets
French poets